Events from the year 1422 in France

Incumbents
 Monarch – Charles VI (until October 21), then Charles VII

Events

21 October – Charles VI of France dies, and his successor Charles VII takes over the throne
Siege of Meaux
The phrase "The king is dead, long live the king!" dates back to 1422

Births

Full date missing
Gaston IV, Count of Foix, nobleman (died 1472)
Louis d'Albret, cardinal (died 1465)

Deaths
21 October – Charles VI of France (born 1368).

See also

References

1420s in France